The Ambassador of Malaysia to the Czech Republic is the head of Malaysia's diplomatic mission to the Czech Republic. The position has the rank and status of an Ambassador Extraordinary and Plenipotentiary and is based in the Embassy of Malaysia, Prague.

List of heads of mission

Ambassadors to the Czech Republic

See also
 Czech Republic–Malaysia relations

References 

 
Czech Republic
Malaysia